Hueymiccaihuitl, also called Xocotlhuetzi, is the name of the tenth month of the Aztec calendar. It is also a festival in the Aztec religion. The Principal deity is Xocotl. It is called Great Feast of the Dead.

References

Aztec calendars
Aztec mythology and religion